Ahmed Kadhim Assad (born on 1 July 1976) is an Iraqi professional football manager and former player, who is the current manager of  club Salam Zgharta.

International career
He was used in a three-man defensive line-up by coach Najih Humoud but was moved to left-back by Adnan Hamad. He made his debut in a 2–0 win over Lebanon in November 1998 in Beirut.

International goals
Scores and results list Iraq's goal tally first.

Managerial statistics

References

External links
 

1976 births
Living people
Iraqi expatriate footballers
Iraqi footballers
Iraq international footballers
Expatriate footballers in Iran
Expatriate footballers in Syria
Iraqi expatriate sportspeople in Iran
Iraqi expatriate sportspeople in Syria
Al-Zawraa SC players
pas players
esteghlal Ahvaz players
Al-Talaba SC players
Al-Jaish Damascus players
Steel Azin F.C. players
al-Naft SC players
2000 AFC Asian Cup players
Association football defenders
Al-Shorta SC players
Expatriate football managers in Lebanon
Lebanese Premier League managers
Salam Zgharta FC managers
Iraqi football managers
Syrian Premier League players